Allan Jay Kellogg Jr. (born October 1, 1943) is a retired sergeant major in the United States Marine Corps. He received the United States military's highest decoration, the Medal of Honor, for his actions as a staff sergeant on March 11, 1970, during the Vietnam War.

Early life
Kellogg was born on October 1, 1943, in Bethel, Connecticut, and graduated from elementary school there in 1958. He attended Bethel High School for two years before dropping out in 1959. He enlisted in the United States Marine Corps on November 14, 1960, in Bridgeport, Connecticut.

Marine Corps service
Kellogg received recruit training at the Marine Corps Recruit Depot Parris Island, South Carolina, and individual combat training at Camp Lejeune, North Carolina. Following graduation, he was assigned duty as a rifleman, assistant automatic rifleman, and fire team leader, consecutively, with Company K, 3rd Battalion, 2nd Marine Division, Camp Lejeune. He was promoted to private first class in June 1961, to lance corporal in April 1962, and to corporal in October 1962. From December 1962 until November 1964, Kellogg served as squad leader with Company D, 1st Battalion, 4th Marines, 1st Marine Brigade. Upon his return to the United States, he was assigned duty as Sergeant of the Guard, Marine Air Base Squadron 31, Marine Aircraft Group 31 at Beaufort, South Carolina. He was promoted to sergeant on May 1, 1965.

In March 1966, Kellogg was transferred to South Vietnam where he served as Weapons Platoon Sergeant and, later, Company Supply Non-commissioned Officer of Company F, 2nd Battalion 9th Marines, 3rd Marine Division. He was promoted to staff sergeant on July 1, 1967. In December, Kellogg was assigned to the 2nd Marine Division, Camp Lejeune, serving as a squad leader with M-16 Special Task Group Command, 3rd Battalion 8th Marines and subsequently as a platoon sergeant and, later, platoon commander of Company I, 3rd Battalion 6th Marines.

Returning for his second tour of duty in December 1969, Kellogg served briefly as a platoon sergeant with Company A, 1st Battalion, 26th Marines. During March 1970, he was reassigned duty as a platoon sergeant of Company G, 2nd Battalion, 5th Marines, 1st Marine Division. His actions on March 11, 1970, earned him the Medal of Honor. Wounded in action in Quang Nam Province on May 8, 1970, he was evacuated to the United States Naval Hospital, Yokosuka, Japan.

Kellogg was released from hospital in October 1970 and returned to duty that December, when he assumed his assignment as Instructor, Field Medical Service School, at Camp Pendleton, California. He was promoted to gunnery sergeant on July 1, 1972. In 1975 he served at Marine Barracks, Pearl Harbor, with the rank of gunnery sergeant. During the Fall of Saigon, while the last Marine troops were conducting the evacuation of the United States Embassy in Saigon, in March and April 1975, he brought a television into the squad bay at Marine Barracks Pearl Harbor. He explained the historical importance of what was happening to a few Marines, his subordinates, who were off duty in the barracks at that time. He served as a role model and highly experienced leader of the Marine Security Guards he held command over at that time. He was later promoted to sergeant major, and retired from the Marine Corps in October 1990.

In May 1984, Kellogg designated The Unknown service member from the Vietnam War during a ceremony at Pearl Harbor, Hawaii. The Unknown service member was later identified in 1998 as Air Force Lieutenant Michael Blassie, following mitochondrial DNA testing.

Later life
After retiring from the military, Kellogg remained in Hawaii and worked for the Department of Veterans Affairs as a benefit counselor at Tripler Army Medical Center in Honolulu. Kellogg's son, former Staff Sergeant Aaron Kellogg who also was highly decorated, is an ex-infantryman and paratrooper who served with the 173rd Airborne.

Awards and honors
A complete list of his medals and decorations includes:

Medal of Honor citation
The President of the United States takes pride in presenting the Medal of Honor to

for service as set forth in the following citation:

See also

List of Medal of Honor recipients
List of Medal of Honor recipients for the Vietnam War

References

 (Medal of Honor citation)

1943 births
Living people
United States Marine Corps Medal of Honor recipients
United States Marine Corps non-commissioned officers
United States Marine Corps personnel of the Vietnam War
Vietnam War recipients of the Medal of Honor
Military personnel from Connecticut
Bethel High School (Connecticut) alumni